The events of 2003 in anime.

Accolades  
At the Mainichi Film Awards, Tokyo Godfathers won the Animation Film Award and Winter Days won the Ōfuji Noburō Award. Internationally, Millennium Actress was nominated for the Annie Award for Best Animated Feature, the third consecutive year an anime was nominated for the award.

Releases 
This list contains numerous notable entries of anime which debuted in 2003. It is not a complete list and represents popular works that debuted as TV, OVA and Movie releases. Web content, DVD specials, TV specials are not on this list.

Films

Television series

Original video animations

See also
2003 in animation

References

External links 
Japanese animated works of the year, listed in the IMDb

Years in anime
2003 in animation
2003 in Japan